Pampas District is one of twelve districts of the province Huaraz in Peru. 
Its capital is the city of Pampas Grande.

Languages
In the district speaks Quechua and Spanish

References

Districts of the Huaraz Province
Districts of the Ancash Region